Giulio Maceratini (13 February 1938 – 25 July 2020) was an Italian politician.

References

20th-century Italian politicians
21st-century Italian politicians
National Alliance (Italy) politicians
Italian Social Movement politicians
Politicians from Rome
1938 births
2020 deaths